Jabal Sabir, also spelled Jabal Saber, is a mountain located in the southern part of Taiz Governorate, Yemen, near the city of Taiz. At more than 3,000 meters, it is one of the highest mountains in Yemen.

References 

Sabir